Nkiru Doris "NK" Okosieme (born 1 March 1972) is a former captain of the Nigerian female football team (Super Falcons) football midfielder who played for the Nigeria women's national football team across four FIFA Women's World Cups (1991, 1995, 1999 and 2003), Several African Women Cup of Nations and 2000 Summer Olympics. Okosieme was nicknamed "The Headmistress" for her habit of scoring important goals with her head.

Career
Okosieme captained Nigeria at the inaugural 1991 FIFA Women's World Cup while still a teenager. She played the full 80 minutes in all three of Nigeria's defeats, while attached to the S.C. Imo State club.

At the 1999 FIFA Women's World Cup, Okosieme was playing for Rivers Angels. Before the tournament she declared: "We no longer have an inferiority complex". She scored three goals in four games as Nigeria reached the quarter-finals, losing 4–3 to Brazil. Okosieme enjoyed playing in America so much that she joined USL W-League club Charlotte Lady Eagles and enrolled at university, where she played college soccer. The W-league is the highest level for women's soccer in U.S. today. In 2001, "NK" was the second highest goal scorer in NCAA Div II. She has won the Peach Belt Conference Player of the Year, and in the All-Regional team for four years. She was also a NSCAA All-American.

Okosieme has won the Africa Women Cup of Nations with the "Super Falcons" on three occasions in 1998, 2000, 2002 .

Her brother Ndubuisi Okosieme was also an international footballer.

See also
 Nigeria at the 2000 Summer Olympics

References

External links
 
 
 
 Profile at Clayton State University

1972 births
Living people
Nigerian women's footballers
Nigeria women's international footballers
Place of birth missing (living people)
Footballers at the 2000 Summer Olympics
Olympic footballers of Nigeria
Women's association football midfielders
1991 FIFA Women's World Cup players
1995 FIFA Women's World Cup players
1999 FIFA Women's World Cup players
2003 FIFA Women's World Cup players
Expatriate women's soccer players in the United States
Nigerian expatriate footballers
Nigerian expatriate sportspeople in the United States
USL W-League (1995–2015) players
Clayton State University alumni
Rivers Angels F.C. players
Charlotte Lady Eagles players
Category Igbo people